Jackson Ferris may refer to:
 Jackson Ferris (rugby league)
 Jackson Ferris (baseball)